John Allan Lindberg (21 June 1918 – 2 May 2004) was a Swedish pole vaulter. In 1946 he won the national title and the 1946 European Athletics Championships, setting a national record. He finished 12th at the 1948 Summer Olympics.

References

1918 births
2004 deaths
Swedish male pole vaulters
Olympic athletes of Sweden
Athletes (track and field) at the 1948 Summer Olympics
European Athletics Championships medalists